Demetrida lineata is a species of ground beetle in Lebiinae subfamily. It was described by Dejean in 1831 and is endemic to Australia.

References

Beetles described in 1831
Beetles of Australia
lineata